Hudson Irving (12 September 1912 – 12 April 1947) was an English professional rugby league footballer who played in the 1930s and 1940s.

Background
Hudson Irving's birth was registered in Cockermouth district, Cumberland. In the 1939 National Register he is living in Halifax with his wife Sarah and two daughters, he is described as a Semi-Skilled FOundry Engineer.

Death
On Saturday 12 April 1947 at a match between Halifax and Dewsbury, at Thrum Hall, Halifax, West Riding of Yorkshire, England, he suffered a heart attack, and he died aged 34.

Playing career

International honours
Hudson Irving won caps for England while at Halifax in 1938 against Wales, in 1940 against Wales, in 1941 against Wales, and in 1943 against Wales.

County Honours
Hudson Irving won caps for Cumberland and Yorkshire while at Halifax.

Challenge Cup Final appearances
Hudson Irving played right-, i.e. number 10, in Halifax's 2-9 defeat by Leeds in the 1940–41 Challenge Cup Final during the 1940–41 season at Odsal, Bradford, in front of a crowd of 28,500.

Other notable matches
Hudson Irving played right- for a Rugby League XIII against Northern Command XIII at Thrum Hall, Halifax on Saturday 21 March 1942.

Club career
Hudson Irving made his dêbut for Halifax on Saturday 2 September 1933, and he played his last match for Halifax on Saturday 12 April 1947.

Honoured at Halifax
Hudson Irving is a Halifax Hall Of Fame Inductee.

References

External links

1912 births
1947 deaths
Cumberland rugby league team players
England national rugby league team players
English rugby league players
Halifax R.L.F.C. players
Rugby league players from Cockermouth
Rugby league second-rows
Rugby League XIII players
Sport deaths in England
Yorkshire rugby league team players